The eleventh and final season of Cheers, an American television sitcom, originally aired on NBC in the United States between September 24, 1992, and May 20, 1993. The show was created by director James Burrows and writers Glen and Les Charles under the production team Charles Burrows Charles Productions, in association with Paramount Television.

Cast and characters
Ted Danson as Sam Malone
Kirstie Alley as Rebecca Howe
Rhea Perlman as Carla Tortelli
John Ratzenberger as Cliff Clavin
Woody Harrelson as Woody Boyd
Kelsey Grammer as Frasier Crane
Bebe Neuwirth as Lilith Sternin-Crane
George Wendt as Norm Peterson

Episodes

References

11
1992 American television seasons
1993 American television seasons